

Events

Births

Deaths
 Dec. 17: Conon de Béthune died 1219 or 1220 (born 1150), crusader and trouvère

See also

 Poetry
 List of years in poetry

13th-century poetry
Poetry